= Progressive Heritage =

2002 book by James Doyle

Progressive Heritage: The Evolution of a Politically Radical Literary Tradition in Canada
- Author: James Doyle
- Publication date: 2002

Progressive Heritage: The Evolution of a Politically Radical Literary Tradition in Canada is a 2002 book written by James Doyle.
